The Canadian Federation of Nurses Unions (CFNU) is a trade union centre in Canada. The CFNU is a federation of provincial unions representing registered nurses, registered psychiatric nurses, registered or licensed practical nurses, nurse practitioners, student nurses and a range of allied health care workers. It advocates on a national level for issues related to nurses, health care and workers.

Affiliations
The CFNU is a founding member of Global Nurses United and collaborates with the International Council of Nurses. It is a member of the Canadian Health Coalition and the Canadian Labour Congress, and sits on the CLC’s executive committee.

Membership
The CFNU represents about 200,000 unionized nurses, student nurses and allied health care workers.  Membership is through provincial nurses’ unions, which are the CFNU’s member organizations. The CFNU’s current member organizations include eight nurses’ unions and one nursing students’ union. Each organization holds a seat on the CFNU’s national executive board, helping to shape the positions and priorities of the national umbrella group.  

CFNU members organizations are: 

 Canadian Nursing Students’ Association
 Registered Nurses’ Union Newfoundland and Labrador
 Nova Scotia Nurses’ Union
 Prince Edward Island Nurses’ Union
 New Brunswick Nurses Union
 Ontario Nurses’ Association
 Manitoba Nurses Union
 Saskatchewan Union of Nurses
 United Nurses of Alberta

History
In Winnipeg on International Workers’ Day, May 1, 1981, the National Federation of Nurses Unions (NFNU) was formed to represent unionized nurses at the national level. More than 300 delegates from every nurses’ union in Canada voted unanimously to form the organization. NFNU was later renamed to Canadian Federation of Nurses Unions (CFNU) in 1999 to represent Canadian nurses internationally.

CFNU established its full-time office in Ottawa in September 1987.

The Founding member organizations were:

 Manitoba Organization of Nurses’ Associations 
 New Brunswick Nurses Union
 Newfoundland and Labrador Nurses’ Union
 Prince Edward Island Provincial Collective Bargaining Committee
 Saskatchewan Union of Nurses

CFNU Presidents:

 Sonny Arrojado (1981-1982)
 Mary Dwyer (1982-1983)
 Kathleen Connors (1983-1999)
 Debra McPherson (acting 1999-2000)
 Kathleen Connors (2000-2003)
 Linda Silas (2003-present)

CFNU Vice-Presidents:

 Mary Dwyer (1981-1982)
 Jane Murray (1983-1985)
 Madeleine Steeves (1985-1987)
 Barbara LeBlanc (1987-1989)
 Maria Ward (1989-1993)
 Debra McPherson (1993-1997)

Note: the CFNU no longer elects vice-presidents.

Secretary-Treasurers:

 Jill Jones (1981-1989)
 Dorothy Bragg (1989-1997)
 Debra McPherson (1997-2001)
 Pauline Worsfold (2001-present)

Timeline of CFNU and Canadian nurses unions
1973 – Ontario Nurses’ Association (ONA) was founded

1974 – Newfoundland Nurses Union (NNU) founded (later Newfoundland and Labrador Nurses’ Union – NLNU, and then since 2014 Registered Nurses’ Union Newfoundland & Labrador – RNUNL)

1974 – Saskatchewan Union of Nurses (SUN) founded

1975 – Manitoba Organization of Nurses’ Associations (MONA) was founded (in 1990 renamed Manitoba Nurses Union – MNU)

1976 – Nova Scotia Nurses’ Union (NSNU) founded

1977 – United Nurses of Alberta (UNA) founded

1978 – New Brunswick Nurses Union (NBNU) founded

1981 – British Columbia Nurses’ Union (BCNU) founded

1981 – National Federation of Nurses Unions (NFNU) founded by Prince Edward Island, New Brunswick, Newfoundland, Manitoba and Saskatchewan

1981 – NSNU joins NFNU

1982 – NFNU joins the Canadian Health Coalition

1985 – Staff Nurses’ Association of Alberta (SNAA) joins NFNU

1987 – NFNU opens a full-time office in Ottawa and president becomes full-time position

1987 – Prince Edward Island Nurses’ Union (PEINU) founded

1987 – Fédération des Infirmières et Infirmiers du Québec (FIIQ) founded, in 2006 renamed Fédération Interprofessionnelle de la santé du Québec (FIQ)

1992 – BCNU joins NFNU

1998 – NFNU joins the Canadian Labour Congress

1999 – United Nurses of Alberta joins CFNU, after merging with SNAA

1999 – National Federation of Nurses Unions (NFNU) renamed to Canadian Federation of Nurses Unions (CFNU)

2000 – ONA joins CFNU

2007 – The Canadian Nursing Students’ Association (CNSA) joins CFNU as associate member

2011 – BCNU leaves CFNU and CLC

2013 – Global Nurses United (GNU) is formed with CFNU as a founding member

2019 – All CFNU Member Organizations affiliated with their provincial federations of labour

Positions and advocacy
The CFNU, along with its member organizations, have championed a wide range of issues and causes, most often related to health care and nurses’ working conditions. It advocates for strong federal leadership in health care.  
The CFNU works with parliamentarians, provincial premiers and health ministers, union members, other organizations and the public to raise awareness and drive policy. The CFNU typically hosts annual policy events, including at the Council of the Federation premiers’ summits, and provincial health ministers’ summits. It has been recognized as a highly effecting lobbying force. 

The CFNU conducts ongoing research on its key priority issues, typically releasing several policy and research reports each year. 

Notable advocacy work includes: 

 Improving health human resources planning  
 Implementing a national, universal pharmacare program  
 Eliminating workplace violence in health care  
 Transforming Canada’s long-term care system  
 Supporting mental health for health care workers, and addressing root causes of stress  
 Ensuring proper protections (including Personal Protection Equipment - PPE) for health care workers  
 COVID vaccine promotion for all Canadians  
 Adequate federal health care funding 

The CFNU also advocates for climate action, universal child care, justice and equity for Indigenous peoples, human rights and equitable access to health care for all, fair wages and retirement security for all workers, and other issues.

See also

 List of nursing organizations
Pharmacare in Canada
Long-term care in Canada

References

External links
nursesunions.ca
canadianlabour.ca
www.healthcoalition.ca

Trade unions established in 1981
Canadian Labour Congress
International Council of Nurses
Nursing organizations in Canada
Healthcare trade unions in Canada